Ivan Lendl won in the final 7–5, 6–2, 2–6, 6–4 against Guillermo Vilas.

Seeds
A champion seed is indicated in bold text while text in italics indicates the round in which that seed was eliminated.

  Ivan Lendl (champion)
  Guillermo Vilas (final)

Draw

References
1982 World Championship Tennis Winter Finals Draw (Archived 2009-05-07)

Singles